Wyre Estuary Country Park is located in Thornton-Cleveleys, Lancashire, England. The Wyre estuary forms part of the southern boundary of Morecambe Bay.

From the park's car park, Fleetwood can be viewed to the north, and there are also vistas across the river to South Lakeland to the northeast, Over Wyre to the east and, beyond, the Bowland Fells.

It has received a Green Flag Award and a VisitEngland Award.

The park is a starting point on the Wyre Way.

Views

Facilities
The park's main feature is its network of footpaths that either follow the course of the river to the east, eventually leading to Skippool Creek, or an inland route over grassland.

A café is situated just inside the main gates, at the end of River Road, while a boat ramp at the end of the car park on the left.

Wildlife
The park is a popular destination for ornithologists and botanists.

The following birds have been seen in the park's vicinity:

Black-tailed godwit
Redshank
Pink-footed goose
Reed bunting
Reed warbler
Sedge warbler
Teal

And the below wildflowers have been observed:

Bee orchid
Birdsfoot trefoil
Bluebells
Comfrey
Frosted orache
Glasswort
Herb Robert
Northern marsh orchid
Ramsons
Red campion
Scurvy-grass
Sea arrowgrass
Sea aster
Sea lavender
Sea milkwort
Sea plantain
Sea purslane
Seablite
Yellow-wort

Hillylaid Pool

Hillylaid Pool empties into the river after its  journey.

References

External links 

Country parks in Lancashire
Geography of the Borough of Wyre
Tourist attractions in the Borough of Wyre
1991 establishments in England